The Fiji Open is a professional golf tournament played in Fiji. It was inaugurated in 1970 as a 54-hole stroke play tournament sponsored by Air New Zealand. During the first event there were 40 players. It has been a 72-hole tournament since the second edition in 1971. In 1973, a full-field of 162 players entered the tournament. As of 1976, it was the second of five events "South Pacific circuit."

Since 2015, the winner and the leading Fijian have been rewarded with entry into the Fiji International.

Winners 
1970 Bruce Rafferty
1971 Frank Molloy
1972 Simon Owen
1973 Paul Shadlock
1974 Bob Tuohy
1975 Frank Phillips
1976 Barry Vivian
1977 George Serhan
1978 Bill Brask
1979 Peter Creighton (a)
1980 Stuart Reese
1981 Alex Bonnington
1982 Richard Coombes
1983 Stuart Reese
1984 Mike Harwood
1985 Greg Turner
1986 Ian Stanley
1987 Brett Officer
1988 Jeff Woodland
1989 Max Stevens
1990 Jason Deep
1991 Rob Willis
1992 Darren Barnes
1993 Jeff Wagner
1994 Neil Kerry
1995 Steven Alker
1996 Elliot Boult
1997 Tony Christie
1998 Mukesh Chand
1999 Neil Kerry
2000 No tournament
2001 Neil Kerry
2002 Salesh Chand
2003 Tony Christie
2004 Ryan Haywood
2005 Marika Batibasaga (a)
2006 Marika Batibasaga (a)
2007 Tony Christie
2008 Brad Shilton
2009 Matthew Griffin
2010 Michael Hendry
2011 Nick Gillespie
2012 Ryan Fox
2013 Ryan Fox
2014 Matt Ballard
2015 Ed Steadman
2016 Gareth Paddison
2017 Kieran Muir
2018 Sam Lee
2019 Sam Lee

Source (1970–2008):

References 

Golf tournaments in Fiji
Recurring sporting events established in 1970